Esenbeckia may refer to:
 Esenbeckia (plant), a genus of flowering plants in family Rutaceae
 Esenbeckia (fly), a genus of horse-flies